Xenophon Kyriakou is a Greek businessman.

Xenophon Kyriakou is the eldest son of Minos Kyriakou and his first wife.

Kyriakou runs Athenian Sea Carriers, the shipping company owned by his father.

He is a director of the Kyriakou Group and Athenian Capital Holdings.

References

Living people
1972 births